Nguyen Binh may refer to::

Nguyễn Bính (1918–1966), Vietnamese poet
Nguyễn Bình (1906–1951), Lieutenant-general in the Viet Minh

See also
Nguyên Bình (disambiguation)